John Fitzgerald and Mark Woodforde were the defending champions, but lost in the quarterfinals to Mark Philippoussis and Patrick Rafter.

Brent Haygarth and Kent Kinnear won the title by defeating Scott Davis and Goran Ivanišević 6–4, 7–6 in the final.

Seeds

Draw

Draw

References

External links
 Official results archive (ATP)
 Official results archive (ITF)

Los Angeles Open (tennis)
1995 ATP Tour
Volvo Tennis Los Angeles
Volvo Tennis Los Angeles